Le Petit Elfe Ferme-l'œil (Op. 73) is an orchestral suite by Florent Schmitt adapted from his music for the homonymous ballet ("divertissement chorégraphique") after a tale by Hans Christian Andersen. The concert suite developed from a piano four hands suite written in 1912 entitled une semaine de Petit Elfe ferme-l'œil was premiered on 1 December 1923 at the Concerts Colonne under the direction of Gabriel Pierné. The ballet was premiered on 5 February 1924 at the Opéra-Comique of Paris under the direction of Albert Wolff.

Analysis 
The suite relates the extraordinary dreams of little Hialmar in seven pieces like the seven days of the week, preceded by a prelude.
 Prelude
 La fête nationale des souris: danse du peuple des souris
 La cigogne lasse: Sarabande
 Le cheval de Ferme-l'œil: galop à la poursuite de la cigogne
 Le mariage de la poupée Berthe: alternance d'un motif de cloches et d'un thème de marche
 La ronde des lettres boiteuses: motif sur un rythme claudicant
 La promenade à travers le tableau: motif de berceuse
 Parapluie chinois: deux thèmes sur la gamme pentatonique
 Running time: 40 minutes

Sources 
 François-René Tranchefort, Guide de la musique symphonique Fayard 1989 (p. 679)

References

External links 
 Florent Schmitt: Une semaine du petit elfe Ferme-l'Oeil on YouTube
 Le Petit Elfe Ferme-l’oeil on Florent Schmitt.com
 Le petit elfe Ferme-l'oeil, Op.73 (Schmitt, Florent) on ISMLP
  Une Semaine Du Petit Elfe Ferme-L'Oeil, Op. 58 (Piano-Four Hands) on Discogs
 Une semaine du petit elfe Ferme-l'Œil. Op. 58 on Data.bnf.fr

Compositions by Florent Schmitt
Orchestral suites
1912 compositions
Music based on works by Hans Christian Andersen